Cédric Olivar (born 6 December 1995) is a French judoka.

He won a medal at the 2021 World Judo Championships.

References

External links

1995 births
Living people
French male judoka
21st-century French people